Elizabeth of Vermandois (c. 1085 – 1131) (or Isabel), was a French noblewoman, who by her two marriages was the mother of 
the 1st Earl of Worcester, the 2nd Earl of Leicester, the 3rd Earl of Surrey, and of Gundred de Warenne, mother of the 4th Earl of Warwick. 

It is believed that she was the source of the famous chequered shield of gold and blue (or and azure) adopted at the dawn of the age of heraldry (in England circa 1200–1215) by her brother and originating before the middle of the 12th century, as did only two other groups of allied English shields, the Mandeville-de Vere "quarterly shields" and the de Clare "chevron shields".

Origins
She was the third daughter of Hugh I, Count of Vermandois (1057–1102) ("Hugh Magnus/Hugh the Great"), the younger son of King Henry I of France. Her mother was Adelaide of Vermandois the daughter of Herbert IV, Count of Vermandois and Adele of Valois. Elizabeth thus represented both the Capetian line of her paternal grandfather King Henry I of France, and the Carolingian line of her maternal grandfather Herbert IV of Vermandois.

First marriage 

She was the wife successively of two Anglo-Norman magnates, firstly of Robert de Beaumont, 1st Earl of Leicester, Count of Meulan (d.1118), by whom she had twin sons, and secondly of William de Warenne, 2nd Earl of Surrey (d.1138), by whom she had a further son and a daughter Gundred de Warenne. 

In 1096 Robert de Beaumont, 1st Earl of Leicester (d. 1118) reputed to be the "wisest man in his time between London and Jerusalem" insisted, in defiance of the laws of the Church, on marrying the very young Elizabeth, he being over fifty at the time. In early 1096 Bishop Ivo, on hearing of the proposed marriage, wrote a letter forbidding the marriage and preventing its celebration on the grounds of consanguinuity, i.e. that the two were related within prohibited degrees. 

In April 1096 Elizabeth's father was able to convince Pope Urban to issue a dispensation for the marriage, and departed on the Crusade preached by that pope, his last act being to see his daughter married to Robert. 

Robert was a nobleman of some significance in France, having inherited lands from his maternal uncle Henry, Count of Meulan. He gained renown fighting in his first battle, in command of the right wing, at the Battle of Hastings as one of the Proven Companions of William the Conqueror.  He was rewarded with ninety manors in the counties of Leicestershire, Northamptonshire, Warwickshire and Wiltshire. The count of Meulan was one of Henry I's "four wise counsellors and was one of the king's commanders at the Battle of Tinchebray" 28 September 1106. In 1107 Robert became Earl of Leicester.

By de Beaumont she had three sons (the eldest of whom were twins) and five or six daughters as follows:

Robert de Beaumont, 2nd Earl of Leicester (born 1104, twin), married and left issue.
Waleran de Beaumont, 1st Earl of Worcester, Count of Meulan (born 1104, twin), married and left issue.
Hugh de Beaumont, 1st Earl of Bedford (born c. 1106), lost his earldom, left issue.
Emma de Beaumont (born 1102), betrothed as an infant to Aumari de Montfort, nephew of William, Count of Évreux, but the marriage never took  place. She probably died young, or entered a convent.
Adeline de Beaumont (b c. 1107), who married firstly, Hugh IV, 4th Lord of Montfort-sur-Risle, and secondly, Richard de Granville  (d. 1147), lord of the manor of Bideford in Devon.
Aubree de Beaumont (b c. 1109) (or Alberee), who married Hugh II of Châteauneuf-en-Thimerais.
Maud de Beaumont (b c. 1111), who married William Lovel.
Isabel de Beaumont (b Aft. 1102), a mistress of King Henry I of England. She first married Gilbert de Clare, 1st Earl of Pembroke, and later married Hervé de Montmorency, Constable of Ireland.

Second marriage
Elizabeth is reputed to have had an affair and left her first husband when he was near death. The historian James Planché claimed (1874) that she was seduced by or fell in love with a younger nobleman, William de Warenne, 2nd Earl of Surrey, whom she married.
However the evidence for such Elizabeth having had an affair is lacking. William had sought a royal bride in 1093, but failed in his attempt to wed Matilda of Scotland (also known as Edith), who later married King Henry I. He  married Elizabeth in 1118, very soon after the death of Robert. Elizabeth survived her second husband.

By William de Warenne she had three sons and two daughters:

William de Warenne, 3rd Earl of Surrey (1119–1148), eldest son and heir;
Ralph de Warenne
Reginald de Warenne, who inherited his father's lands in Upper Normandy, including the castles of Bellencombre and Mortemer. He married Alice de Wormegay, daughter of William de Wormegay, Lord of Wormegay in Norfolk, by whom he had a son: **William de Warenne, founder of Wormegay Priory.
Gundred de Warenne (or Gundrada), who married firstly Roger de Beaumont, 2nd Earl of Warwick (c.1102-1153) (the nephew of her mother's first husband) and had issue William de Beaumont, 3rd Earl of Warwick (c.1140-1184); secondly she married William de Lancaster, feudal baron of Kendal in Westmorland, and had issue.
Ada de Warenne (d. ca. 1178), who married Henry of Scotland, 3rd Earl of Huntingdon, younger son of King David I of Scotland, and had issue. She is known as the "Queen mother of Scotland" for her two sons, Malcolm IV, King of Scotland and William I 'the Lion', King of Scotland, as well as being the ancestor of numerous other Scottish kings.

References

External links
Elizabeth de Vermandois on thepeerage.com

1080s births
1131 deaths
Year of birth uncertain
Capetian House of Vermandois
Leicester
Burials at Lewes Priory
11th-century English women
11th-century English people
12th-century English women
12th-century English people
11th-century French women
11th-century French people
12th-century French women
12th-century French people